Puhtu-Laelatu Nature Reserve is a nature reserve situated in western Estonia, in Lääne County. It is located in the territory of Pivarootsi, Rame and Hanila villages and in Virtsu small borough.

The nature reserve encompasses parts of Puhtu peninsula and nearby Laelatu wooded meadows. The nature reserve is a species-rich conservation area comprising mainly herb-rich forested areas, coastal meadows and alvars.
It is the only known place in Estonia where the orchid Dactylorhiza ruthei grows. Other rare species include Cypripedium calceolus and Angelica palustris

See also
Puhtu Biological Station

Gallery

References

Nature reserves in Estonia
Geography of Lääne County
Tourist attractions in Lääne County
Lääneranna Parish
Ramsar sites in Estonia